W&G Records was an Australian recording company that operated from the early 1950s to the 1970s. It was a subsidiary of the Melbourne precision engineering company White & Gillespie.

W&G released many significant recordings by Australian popular artists of the 1960s and also issued recordings of popular American artists, notably releases from the ABC-Paramount (Ampar) label, which W&G distributed from 1955 until 1960, when the Australian distribution was taken over by Festival Records. Recording engineer and producer Bill Armstrong worked at W&G from 1956 to 1961, prior to opening his own studio in 1965.

W&G also established a special subsidiary label, In Records, which released the classic mid-1960s recordings by the Loved Ones.

List of  W&G Records artists
This is a list of recording artists who have had at least one recording released on the W&G record label.
In alphabetical order:

 Arthur & Mary – 

 Bartholomew Plus Three – "Cause I'm Alone" / "On a Wintery Night"
 Belfast Gypsies – 
 Merv Benton – "Baby Let's Play House" / "Endless Sleep"
 Bobby Bland – 
 The Blarney Stones – Rocking Alone In An Old Rocking Chair (LP)
 Blanch Jewel - "By The Window" / "Christmas Kangaroo"
 Bobby Bright – "There's a Great Day a-Coming" / "Girls Never Notice Me"
 Donald Britton - plays Organ Music by British French and German Composers (LP) 
 James Brown – 
 
Al Casey and the KCettes - "Surfin' Hootenanny"
 Pat Carroll – "To The Sun"
 Casinos – 
 Johnny Chester with the Thunderbirds – "Hokey Pokey" / "Can Can Ladies"
 Contours – "Do You Love Me"
 Colin Cook –
 Frankie Davidson - "I Care for You"
 Jackie Day – "Before It's Too Late"
 Sergio de Pieri – Organ Recital — St. Patrick's Cathedral, Melbourne
 
 Anne Dreyer – "Storytelling Time"
 Judith Durham with Frank Traynor's Jazz Preachers – Judy Durham (EP) 1963
 
 John Farrar – 
 Johnny Farnham – 

 Martin Gale and His Old Timers – "It's Honky-Tonk Time"
 Johnny Greenwood – "Loving Arms"
The Gospel Harmoneers - gospel quartet- 45s Gospel Rhythm and Gospel Gems, 1961
 The Haunted - "1-2-5"
 Herbie's People - "Sweet & Tender Romance" / "You Thrill Me To Pieces"
 Donald Jenkins & The Delighters – "Somebody Help Me"
 Paul Paffen – "Golden Voice Across the Valley"
 Lotte Landl – 
 Little Gulliver – 
 Athol Guy – The Seekers
 Hayes Brothers & The Bluegrass Ramblers – "Great Speckled Bird" / "Hello City Limits"
 Joe Hinton – 
 Joe Grech – 
 Johnny Mac- Pink Champagne and a Room of Roses (1964)/ Don't Waste Time with Teardrops (1964)/I Found a Flower/Jingle Bell Rock/ Railroad Tracks
 Lynn Hope – "Morocco" / "Broken Hearted" (1954)
 
 Johnny Lo Piccolo (John St Peeters) – 
 The Loved Ones – "The Loved One" / "Ever Loving Man" / "Sad Dark Eyes"
 Maximum Load – "Nolene"

 Russell Morris – "Hush EP" (1967)
 Paul Paffen – Golden Voice Across the Valley LP
 Bunny Paul – "I'm Hooked"
 Reg Poole – "Australian Country Music Hall of Fame Song" (1973)
 Keith Potger – The Seekers

 
 The Red Onion Jazz Band – The Red Onion Jazz Band (1965) LP, Hot Red Onions (1965) LP, Big Band Memories (1967) LP.
 Paul Revere & The Raiders – In the Beginning LP
 Donn Reynolds - "The Parting" / "Little Old Log Shanty" (1961)

 The Seekers – "Waltzing Matilda", The Seekers Sing Their Big Hits LP
 Kevin Shegog – "Wolverton Mountain" / "One Small Photograph" (1962) "Phar Lap (The Red Terror)" / "Johnny Was A Friend Of Mine" (1965)
 Tony Sheveton – "A Million Drums" / "Dance With Me" (1964)
 Ernie Sigley – 
 Soul-Jers – 
 Gene Summers & the Platinum Fog – "Hot Pants" / "Young Voices of Children" (1971)
 The Thunderbirds – "Wild Weekend"
 Diana Trask – "Going Steady" / "Comes Love"
 Frank Traynor's Jazz Preachers – Judy Durham with Frank Traynor's Jazz Preachers
 Webb Brothers – Clancy of the Overflow LP

 Bruce Woodley – The Seekers

 The Cherokees - "Moon in the Afternoon" (instrumental)
 The Strangers 
 The Hawking Brothers
 Pam Bradley
 Pam & Ade
 Paul Anka - "Diana" / "Don't Gamble With Love" (1957) WG-SPN496 Plain yellow label with black text
 The Spotnicks - "Orange Blossom Special" / "The Spotnicks Theme" (1962) WG-S-1450 Yellow label with black text, except W&G which is in red text
 Ned Miller - "From A Jack To A King" / "Parade Of Broken Hearts" (1963) WG-S-1536 Yellow label with black text, except W&G which is in red text
 Peter Posa - "The White Rabbit" / "Honey Be My Honey Bee" (1963) WG-S-1735 Yellow label with black text, except W&G which is in red text
 The Seekers - The Seekers Sing Their Big Hits (1965) WG 25/2512 Yellow label with blue text. Original release with B&W image on album cover. A different colour photograph was used on a stereo release of this album.
 Dennis Gibbons - "The Drovers Dream" 1964
 The Breakaways - "Bonaparte's Retreat"/"You're Just in Love"

References

External links
Article at Milesago.com
Discography 1955-1977
Discography 1955-1972

Defunct record labels of Australia